Sandora Lavett Irvin (born February 23, 1982) is an American professional basketball player for the Women's National Basketball Association (WNBA). She was waived by the San Antonio Silver Stars in 2009.

In her WNBA career, Irvin has scored 91 points, and has collected 100 rebounds, 14 assists, 10 steals, and 26 blocks.

Early life 
Irvin is the daughter of Daughn Irvin and Angela Hollis and is the niece of former Dallas Cowboys star wide receiver Michael Irvin and a cousin Trevis Graham who played for the golden golfers.

In Irvin's senior season in college she averaged 19.9 points and 11.9 points per game and tallied 150 blocked shots, two shy of tying the NCAA's single-season record at that time. Irvin previously held the NCAA record for career blocked shots, with 480, when she graduated in 2005. She broke the old mark of 428 set in 1991. Her record was surpassed by Louella Tomlinson of Saint Mary's in 2010, who finished her career with 663 blocks.

As a senior Irvin was also named to the AP All-America first team and selected as a Kodak All-American. She also earned USBWA All-American and Conference USA Player of the Year honors. Irvin was named Conference USA Defensive Player of the Year for the third consecutive season. She ended her junior season with 15 consecutive double-doubles She set the TCU single-season records for points (504), rebounds (366) and field goals made (195) as a junior.

TCU statistics

Source

WNBA career

Phoenix Mercury 
On April 16, 2005, Irvin was drafted by the Phoenix Mercury in the first round (No. 3 overall) of the 2005 WNBA Draft. In her rookie season, Irvin played in 12 regular season games averaging 3.7 points, 2.8 rebounds, 0.50 blocks, 0.42 steals and 10.2 minutes per game.

During the 2006 WNBA season, Irvin appeared in 7 regular season games for the Mercury, averaging 1.0 points and 1.1 rebounds per game.

San Antonio Silver Stars 
After two seasons with the Mercury, Irvin was traded by Phoenix to the San Antonio Silver Stars in exchange for a second round 2008 draft pick.
During the 2007 WNBA season, Irvin appeared in 23 games for the Silver Stars averaging 1.2 points, 1.7 rebounds, 0.40 blocks, 0.1 steals and 5.6 minutes per game.
She was waived by the San Antonio Silver Stars on May 12, 2009.

Chicago Sky 
After spending some time on the free agent market, she signed a training camp contract with the Chicago Sky. She was later named to the team. During her run with the Sky, she appeared in 18 games. Started in one of the games. Sandora averaged 1.9 points, 1.4 rebounds, o.33 blocks, 0.11 steals and 7.6 minutes per game. She was waived by the Chicago Sky on July 22, 2010.

International career 
Irvin played overseas for Club USP-CEU MMT Estudiantes (Madrid, Spain) in the First Division of the Liga Feminina (LF). In 14 games, Irvin has averaged 13.5 points, 9.9 rebounds, 1.4 assists and 1.3 blocks per game. She is among the Spanish LF overall league leaders in points per game (15th), rebounds per game (third) and blocks per game (third).

On July 6, 2007 Irvin officially signed with Puig d’en Valls, a team in Spain which completed its sixth straight season in the Liga Femenina, Her statistics starting from January 2007, when she landed in Madrid's Estudiantes team, are notable: 13.5 points, 10 rebounds and 2 blocks per game, twice selected game MVP.

Off the court 
In 2007 Irvin joined her alma mater's, Texas Christian University, women's basketball staff as Director of Operations.

WNBA career statistics 
 Correct as of May 2008

Notes

External links 
TCU Horned Frogs bio

1982 births
Living people
All-American college women's basketball players
American women's basketball players
Basketball players from Florida
Forwards (basketball)
Phoenix Mercury draft picks
Phoenix Mercury players
San Antonio Stars players
Sportspeople from Fort Lauderdale, Florida
TCU Horned Frogs women's basketball players